The Mittlere Reife (lit. "Middle Maturity") is a school-leaving certificate in Germany that is usually awarded after ten years of schooling. It is roughly comparable with the British GCSE.

The official name varies between the federal states, such as Realschulabschluss, Wirtschaftsschulabschluss, Qualifizierter Sekundarabschluss I, Sekundarabschluss I – Realschulabschluss and Mittlerer Schulabschluss.  The Mittlere Reife can be awarded to students who attend a number of different schools, including the Hauptschule, the Realschule, the Werkrealschule, the Berufsfachschule, the Wirtschaftschule and the Gesamtschule.

Students awarded the Mittlere Reife in most cases will not be allowed to progress directly into a German university, but must attend another school that awards the Abitur such as the Aufbaugymnasium or the Abendgymnasium or an equivalent type of school. Once students earn an Abitur, they may go on to university.

Non-German graduation certificates that compare to the Mittlere Reife such as the American high school diploma generally do not qualify the bearer for attending a German university. However those holding a high school diploma will be able to study at a German university nevertheless if they did well on the SAT or ACT.

References 

Education in Germany
School qualifications